The Sale of Spirits Act 1750 (commonly known as the Gin Act 1751) was an Act of the Parliament of Great Britain (citation 24 Geo. II c. 40) which was enacted in order to reduce the consumption of gin and other distilled spirits, a popular pastime that was regarded as one of the primary causes of crime in London. By prohibiting gin distillers from selling to unlicensed merchants and increasing fees charged to merchants, it eliminated small gin shops, thereby restricting the distribution of gin to larger distillers and retailers in the Kingdom of Great Britain.

History
First imported from the Netherlands in the 1690s, gin began to rival beer as the most popular drink in the Kingdom of England. In 1689, the English government opened the distilling trade to all English people who paid certain taxes. Over the next sixty years, however, the government regulated the sale of gin with inconsistent taxation policy. The ready availability and low cost of gin led to a massive rise in alcohol consumption in England, which became historically known as the "Gin Craze"; by the 1730s, consumption in London had risen to the equivalent of 2 pints per week per Londoner.

Politicians and religious leaders argued that gin drinking encouraged laziness and criminal behavior. In 1729, Parliament passed a Gin Act which increased the retail tax to 5 shillings per gallon. With the Gin Act 1736 the government imposed a high license fee for gin retailers and a 20 shillings retail tax per gallon. These actions were unpopular with the working-classes and resulted in riots in London in 1743. The license fee and tax were lowered significantly within a few years.

The Act
The Gin Act of 1751 prohibited gin distillers from selling to unlicensed merchants, restricted retail licenses to substantial property holders and charged high fees to those merchants eligible for retail licenses. To offer the masses another invigorating (and non-alcoholic) beverage the import of tea was also encouraged. Also, men were encouraged to drink beer.

See also
Gin Craze
Beer Street and Gin Lane

References

Further reading

Alcohol law in the United Kingdom
Great Britain Acts of Parliament 1751
Gins